Cathedral of the Nativity, and its variants, can refer to: 

Albania
Shkodër Orthodox Cathedral (Nativity of Christ Orthodox Cathedral)

Egypt
 Cathedral of the Nativity of Christ (Cairo)

Latvia
Nativity Cathedral, Riga

Moldova
Nativity Cathedral, Chișinău

Russia
Cathedral of the Nativity in Suzdal

South Africa
Cathedral of the Holy Nativity, Pietermaritzburg

Transnistria
Church of the Nativity, Tiraspol, also known as the Cathedral of the Birth of Christ

United States
Cathedral Church of the Nativity (Bethlehem, Pennsylvania)

See also
Church of the Nativity (disambiguation)
Church of the Nativity of the Theotokos (disambiguation)
Cathedral of the Nativity of the Blessed Virgin Mary (disambiguation)